Stinging Fork Falls State Natural Area, a Tennessee Class II Natural-Scientific State Scenic Area, is located in Rhea County, Tennessee, near Spring City.

A future segment of the Cumberland Trail is planned to connect to the falls.

The  area is owned by the State of Tennessee and managed by the Tennessee Department of Environment and Conservation. It was formerly owned and managed by Bowater Paper Company, which designated several areas in Tennessee as "Pocket Wildernesses" for public recreation.

References

External links
 Topographic maps and GPS waypoints of Stinging Fork Falls
 State of Tennessee Natural Area
 Stinging Fork Segment of Cumberland Trail

Waterfalls of Tennessee
Protected areas of Rhea County, Tennessee
Nature reserves in Tennessee
Landforms of Rhea County, Tennessee